Kalogeras is a Greek family name. Like Kalogeropoulos it is derived from the Greek word καλόγερος (kalógēros: from Ancient Greek καλός (kalos) "good" and γήρας (géras) "old age") for "monk." The genitive case form Kalogera (Καλογερά) is applied to female name bearers.
Notable people with this name include:

 Ioannis Kalogeras, Greek army officer and politician
 Nicos Kalogeras, former Chief Commissioner of the Scouts of Greece
 Vassiliki Kalogera (born 1971), Greek astrophysicist

Foreign variants of this surname exist, including the form in romanized Macedonian Kalogjera, Serbo-Croatian Kalodjera and Kalođera. The Croatian Kalogjeras are a cadet branch of the Calogerà family of Venice, and they achieved prominence on the island of Korčula before settling in other cities across Dalmatia and in Zagreb.

 Marko Kalogjera, Commendatore, famous 19th century Bishop of Split, Makarska, and Kotor
 Marko Kalogjera, first Bishop of the Old Catholic Church in Croatia
 Nikica Kalogjera, M.D., famous Croatian composer and film- and music producer

See also

 Calogerà family

References 

Greek-language surnames
Surnames